Thomas Alan Rolander is an American entrepreneur, engineer, and developer of the multitasking multiuser operating system MP/M created for microcomputers in 1979 while working as one of the first employees of Digital Research with Gary Kildall, the "father" of CP/M. CP/M and MP/M laid the groundwork to later Digital Research operating system families such as Concurrent CP/M, Concurrent DOS and Multiuser DOS. He also developed CP/NET.

In 2013 he was granted with a 2013 Diamond Award for Entrepreneurial Excellence from the University of Washington (UW).

See also

 Fluke
 Intel
 Novell
 KnowledgeSet
 The Electronic Encyclopedia from Grolier (CD-ROM)
 Sony Electronic Book Authoring System (SEBAS)
 PGSoft
 iFolder
 Crossloop
 Benetech
 Big Sur International Marathon
 CSU Monterey Bay
 Pacific Grove, California

References

Further reading 
 
 

Digital Research employees
Digital Research people
CP/M people
21st-century American engineers
American computer programmers
University of Washington alumni
Living people
Year of birth missing (living people)